Thaitone is a color scheme designed to follow colors used in traditional Thai art. It was compiled by Pairoj Pittayamatee, and is the result of 10 years study about the traditional color making and using in Thailand art history for his master's and doctoral degrees at Silpakorn University. The identity of Thai color is a hundred percent made by natural ingredients, plants and minerals that can be found in Thailand. The shade is soft and not too vivid. The problem is the color will not be exactly the same color in each time of making because it is the handmade product. To make the use of Thaitone color scheme universal, Professor Pairoj set the aim of the study to research and compare Thai’s color scheme with CMYK standard by using Pantone color system and collected them as a database for everyone especially for Thai designers who can adapt the Thaitone color to use in design world nowadays. Now (Jan 2017), there are 156 colors identified in CMYK color standard. Thaitone color has become one of Thailand’s cultural identities by reflecting the beauty, belief and characteristics of Thailand.

Primary Colors in Thaitone 
Same as universal primary color standard, Thaitone primary color consists of Red, Yellow and Blue. The colors are called, Chard (Red), Rong (Yellow) and Kraam (Blue).  However, the tone of the color is not the same as the standard.

Chard 

		Chard is vermillion. It is considered as the most important color in Thai art as the red color represents the auspicious thing and heaven in Thai belief.

Rong 

		Rong is gamboge tint. The word Rong is from Rong Thong tree (Gracinia Hanbury Hook) which is the tree that can be easily found along the seaside province of the Gulf of Thailand.

Kraam 

Kraam is indigo color from the color pigment of Indigo’s stem and leaves. Kraam could be considered as the most familiar Thaitone color for Thai people according to the color is very popular in traditional Thai's dyeing.

Benjarong - 5 Primary Color in Thaitone 
These 5 primary colors consist of the three of primary colors in Thaitone which are Chard, Rong, Kraam and other two colors are black and white. Benjarong color was used popularly in traditional Thai’s mural art and in Thai’s traditional porcelain painting.

10 groups of Thaitone 
These 10 groups of Thaitone colors consist of five primary colors (Benjarong) that are Chard, Rong, Kraam, black, white and other 5 colors which are created from the mixing between colors in Benjarong Color groups that are Orange, Green, Violet, Brown and Gold.

Ingredients for making color in Thai’s color making.

Thaitone Color nowadays 
The use of Thaitone color is now supported by Thailand's Ministry of Culture to promote Thailand's identity. From the study of Professor Pairoj, he can identify 156 colors. He gave the Thai name to each color and used Pantone Color Analysing Program to find the CMYK code so that it can be used worldwide. There are new colors being discovered continuously so Professor Pairoj is still working on the project to identify more CMYK code. He has also done the copyright for the name "THAITONE" even though the percentage of color ratio, color name, graphic of Thaitone color are allowed to use freely to be the reference of color in design work as long as the users give credit to THAITONE Color System.

References 

Thai art
Color schemes